Peter Paul Montgomery Buttigieg (born January 19, 1982) is an American politician and former naval officer who is currently serving as the 19th United States secretary of transportation. A member of the Democratic Party, he was the 32nd mayor of South Bend, Indiana, from 2012 to 2020, which earned him the nickname "Mayor Pete".

Buttigieg is a graduate of Harvard College and the University of Oxford, attending the latter on a Rhodes Scholarship. From 2009 to 2017, he was an intelligence officer in the United States Navy Reserve, attaining the rank of lieutenant. He was mobilized and deployed to the War in Afghanistan for seven months in 2014. Before being elected as mayor of South Bend in 2011, Buttigieg worked on the political campaigns of Democrats Jill Long Thompson, Joe Donnelly, and John Kerry, and ran unsuccessfully as the Democratic nominee for Indiana state treasurer in 2010. While serving as South Bend's mayor, Buttigieg came out as gay in 2015. He married Chasten Glezman, a schoolteacher and writer, in June 2018. Buttigieg declined to seek a third term as mayor.

Buttigieg ran as a candidate for president in the 2020 Democratic Party presidential primaries, launching his campaign for the 2020 United States presidential election on April 14, 2019. He became one of the first openly gay men to launch a major party presidential campaign. Despite initially low expectations, he gained significant momentum in mid-2019 when he participated in several town hall meetings and television debates. Buttigieg narrowly won the Iowa caucuses and placed a close second in the New Hampshire primary. By winning Iowa, he became the first openly gay candidate to win a presidential primary or caucus. Buttigieg dropped out of the race on March 1, 2020, and endorsed Joe Biden the following day.

President-elect Biden named Buttigieg as his nominee for Secretary of Transportation in December 2020. His nomination was confirmed on February 2, 2021, by a vote of 86–13, making him the first openly gay Cabinet secretary in U.S. history. Nominated at age 38, he is also the youngest Cabinet member in the Biden administration and the youngest person ever to serve as Secretary of Transportation.

Early life and career
Pete Buttigieg, the only child of Jennifer Anne (Montgomery) and Joseph Anthony Buttigieg II, was born on January 19, 1982, in South Bend, Indiana. His mother uses the name Anne Montgomery. His parents met and married while employed as faculty at New Mexico State University. His father was born in Hamrun, Malta, and emigrated to the United States to pursue his doctorate. Buttigieg's father embarked on a career as a professor of English at the University of Notre Dame near South Bend. Buttigieg's mother also taught at the University of Notre Dame for 29 years. His father was a translator and editor of the three-volume English edition of Marxist philosopher Antonio Gramsci's Prison Notebooks and influenced his pursuit of literature in college.

Education 
Buttigieg was valedictorian of the class of 2000 at St.Joseph High School in South Bend. That year, he won first prize in the John F. Kennedy Presidential Library and Museum's Profiles in Courage essay contest. He traveled to Boston to accept the award and met Caroline Kennedy and other members of President Kennedy's family. The subject of his winning essay was the integrity and political courage of then U.S. representative Bernie Sanders of Vermont, one of only two independent politicians in Congress. In 2000, Buttigieg was also chosen as one of two student delegates from Indiana to the United States Senate Youth Program, an annual scholarship competition sponsored jointly by the U.S. Senate and the Hearst Foundations.

After graduating from St. Joseph High School, Buttigieg attended Harvard University, where he majored in history and literature. He became president of the Student Advisory Committee of the Harvard Institute of Politics and worked on the institute's annual study of youth attitudes on politics. He wrote his undergraduate thesis, titled The Quiet American's Errand into the Wilderness, on the influence of Puritanism on U.S. foreign policy as reflected in Graham Greene's novel The Quiet American. He graduated magna cum laude from Harvard in 2004, and was elected a member of Phi Beta Kappa.

Buttigieg was awarded a Rhodes Scholarship to study at the University of Oxford. In 2007, he received a Bachelor of Arts degree with first-class honours in philosophy, politics, and economics after studying at Pembroke College, Oxford. At Oxford, he was an editor of the Oxford International Review, and was a co-founder and member of the Democratic Renaissance Project, an informal debate and discussion group of approximately a dozen Oxford students.

Professional career 
Before graduating from college, Buttigieg was an investigative intern at WMAQ-TV, Chicago's NBC News affiliate. He also interned for Democrat Jill Long Thompson during her unsuccessful 2002 congressional bid.

After college, Buttigieg worked on John Kerry's 2004 presidential campaign as a policy and research specialist for several months in Arizona and New Mexico. From 2004 to 2005, Buttigieg was conference director of the Cohen Group. In 2006, he lent assistance to Joe Donnelly's successful congressional campaign.

After earning his Oxford degree, in 2007 Buttigieg became a consultant at the Chicago office of McKinsey & Company, where he worked on energy, retail, economic development, and logistics for three years. His clients at McKinsey included the health insurer Blue Cross Blue Shield of Michigan, electronics retailer Best Buy, Canadian supermarket chain Loblaws, two nonprofit environmentalist groups, the Natural Resources Defense Council and Energy Foundation, and several U.S. government agencies, the Environmental Protection Agency (EPA), Energy Department, Defense Department, and Postal Service. He took a leave of absence from McKinsey in 2008 to become research director for Jill Long Thompson's unsuccessful campaign for Indiana governor. His work at McKinsey included trips to Iraq and Afghanistan, which he rarely discusses. Buttigieg left McKinsey in 2010 in order to focus full-time on his campaign for Indiana state treasurer.

Buttigieg has been involved with the Truman National Security Project since 2005 and serves as a fellow with expertise in Afghanistan and Pakistan. He was named to the organization's board of advisors in 2014.

Military service 
Buttigieg joined the U.S. Navy Reserve through the direct commission officer (DCO) program and was sworn in as an ensign in naval intelligence in September 2009. He took a seven-month leave during his mayoral term to deploy to Afghanistan in 2014. While there, Buttigieg was part of a unit assigned to identify and disrupt terrorist finance networks. Part of this was done at Bagram Air Base, but he was also an armed driver for his commander on more than 100 trips into Kabul. Buttigieg has jokingly referred to his role as an armed driver as "military Uber", because he had to watch out for ambushes and explosive devices along the roads and ensure that the vehicle was guarded. Also, while deployed in Afghanistan, Buttigieg was assigned to the Afghan Threat Finance Cell, a counterterrorism unit that targeted Taliban insurgency financing. Buttigieg was awarded the Joint Service Commendation Medal, and he left the U.S. Navy Reserve in 2017.

Indiana state treasurer election 

Buttigieg was the Democratic nominee for state treasurer of Indiana in 2010. He received 37.5 percent of the vote, losing to Republican incumbent Richard Mourdock. Much of Buttigieg's campaign had focused on criticizing Mourdock for investing state pension funds in Chrysler junk bonds, and for having subsequently filed a lawsuit against Chrysler's bankruptcy restructuring, which Buttigieg argued imperiled Chrysler jobs in the state of Indiana.

Mayor of South Bend

First term
Shortly after losing the 2010 Indiana State Treasurer election, Buttigieg ran for the Democratic nomination for mayor of South Bend in 2011. In a PBS Michiana – WNIT broadcast, he expressed his desire to reinvigorate South Bend, especially with respect to job creation and education. Buttigieg campaigned on other issues, such as pursuing international investment, increasing presence of police and other safety professionals, and improving city services. Buttigieg won his primary election against four opponents on May 3, 2011, receiving 7,663 votes.
Buttigieg was elected mayor of South Bend in the November 2011 general election with 10,991 of the 14,883 votes cast, or 74 percent of all votes. He defeated Republican nominee Norris W. Curry Jr. and Libertarian nominee Patrick M. Farrell. Buttigieg took office in January 2012 at the age of 29, becoming the second-youngest mayor in South Bend history and the youngest incumbent mayor, at the time, of a U.S. city with at least 100,000 residents.

Before Buttigieg took office, Jiha'd Vasquez, a 16-year-old black boy, was found hanging from an electrical tower on April 14, 2011. Vasquez's backpack, on the ground near his body, had several items missing, according to Vasquez's mother Stephanie Jones. The coroner, Chuck Hurley, who had no medical experience, claimed Vasquez's death was a suicide; Buttigieg later appointed Hurley to serve as interim police chief. Vasquez's body was cremated without an autopsy being conducted. Jones attempted to get Buttigieg to investigate her son's death, but he did not, fearing "potential political risks." According to Jones, Buttigieg told her to call his office, but she never got a response. Jones and South Bend NAACP legal redress chairman Tom Bush claimed the event was a cover-up, with Bush saying he suspected the Ku Klux Klan may be involved and hoped for a federal investigation, but did not expect it, saying "the only reason this will get done is if you’re on a microphone yelling and screaming." When Buttigieg's presidential campaign was asked about the incident by a reporter in 2019, they did not give a response. In 2019, Jones and St.Joseph County coroner Mike McGann argued that the case should be reopened; however, sheriff William Redman said he would not consider reopening the case unless further evidence came to light.

After a federal investigation ruled that South Bend police had illegally recorded telephone calls of several officers, Buttigieg demoted police chief Darryl Boykins in 2012. Buttigieg also dismissed the department's communications director, who had discovered the recordings but continued to record the line at Boykins's command. The police communications director alleged that the recordings captured four senior police officers making racist remarks and discussing illegal acts.

Buttigieg has written that his "first serious mistake as mayor" came shortly after taking office in 2012, when he decided to ask for Boykins's resignation. Backed by supporters and legal counsel, Boykins requested reinstatement. When Buttigieg denied his request, Boykins, as the city's first African-American police chief, sued the city for racial discrimination, arguing that the taping policy had existed under previous police chiefs, who were white. Buttigieg settled the lawsuits brought by Boykins and the four officers out of court for over $800,000. A federal judge ruled in 2015 that Boykins's recordings violated the Federal Wiretap Act. Buttigieg came under pressure from political opponents to release the eight tapes, but he said that it was not possible to release seven of them, citing the Federal Wiretap Act. It was unclear if releasing the eighth tape would violate any laws. St. Joseph County Superior Court Judge Steve Hostetler heard a case for the release of five cassette tapes. Judge Hostetler ruled that the cassette tapes must be released to the South Bend City Council in May 2021.

As mayor, Buttigieg promoted a number of development and redevelopment projects. Buttigieg was a leading figure behind the creation of a nightly laser-light display along downtown South Bend's St.Joseph River trail as public art. The project cost $700,000, which was raised from private funds. The "River Lights" installation was unveiled in May 2015 as part of the city's 150th anniversary celebrations. He also oversaw the city's launching of a 3-1-1 system in 2013. Buttigieg's administration oversaw the sale of numerous city-owned properties. One of Buttigieg's signature programs was the "Vacant and Abandoned Properties Initiative". Known locally as 1,000 Properties in 1,000 Days, it was a project to repair or demolish blighted properties across South Bend. The program reached its goal two months before its scheduled end date in November 2015. By the thousandth day of the program, before Buttigieg's first term ended, nearly 40 percent of the targeted houses were repaired, and 679 were demolished or under contract for demolition. Buttigieg took note of the fact that many homes within communities of color were the ones demolished, leading to early distrust between the city and these communities.

While mayor, Buttigieg served for seven months in Afghanistan as a lieutenant in the U.S. Navy Reserve, returning to the United States on September 23, 2014. In his absence, Deputy Mayor Mark Neal, South Bend's city comptroller, served as executive from February 2014 until Buttigieg returned to his role as mayor in October 2014.

In 2015, during the controversy over Indiana Senate Bill 101the original version of which was widely criticized for allowing discrimination against lesbian, gay, bisexual, and transgender peopleButtigieg emerged as a leading opponent of the legislation. Amid his reelection campaign, he came out as gay and expressed his solidarity with the LGBTQ community.

Second term
Buttigieg announced in 2014 that he would seek a second term in 2015. He won the Democratic primary with approximately 78 percent of the vote, defeating Henry Davis Jr., the city councilman from the second district. In November 2015, he was elected to his second term as mayor with over 80 percent of the vote, defeating Republican Kelly Jones by a margin of 8,515 to 2,074 votes. After winning reelection, Buttigieg signed an executive order helping to establish a recognized city identification card in 2016.

To improve South Bend's downtown area, Buttigieg proposed a Smart Streets urban development program in 2013. In early 2015after traffic studies and public hearingshe secured a bond issue for the program backed by tax increment financing. Smart Streets was a complete streets implementation program aimed at improving economic development and urban vibrancy as well as road safety. Elements of the project were finished in 2016, and was officially completed in 2017. The project was credited with spurring private development in the city.

In a new phase of the Vacant and Abandoned Properties Initiative, South Bend partnered with the Notre Dame Clinical Law Center to provide free legal assistance to qualifying applicants wishing to acquire vacant lots and, with local nonprofits, to repair or construct homes and provide low-income home ownership assistance using South Bend Housing and Urban Development funds.

The City of South Bend partnered with the State of Indiana and private developers to break ground on a $165million renovation of the former Studebaker complex in 2016, hoping that the redevelopment would facilitate industrial and housing units. This development is in the Renaissance District, which includes nearby Ignition Park. In 2017, it was announced that the long-abandoned Studebaker Building84, also known as Ivy Tower, would have its exterior renovated with $3.5million in Regional Cities funds from the State of Indiana and another $3.5million from South Bend tax increment financing, with plans for the building and other structures in its complex to serve as a technology hub. The website Best Cities later ranked South Bend number 39 on its 2020 list of the 100 best small cities in the United States, citing Buttigieg's efforts to revitalize the Studebaker factory and Downtown South Bend.

Under Buttigieg, the city also began a smart sewer program, the first phase of which was finished in 2017 at a cost of $150million. The effort used federal funds and by 2019 had reduced the combined sewer overflow by 75 percent. The impetus for the effort was a fine that the EPA had levied against the city in 2011 for Clean Water Act violations. In 2019, Buttigieg asked for the city to be released from an agreement with the EPA brokered under his mayoral predecessor Steve Luecke, in which South Bend had agreed to make hundreds of millions dollars in further improvements to its sewer system by 2031.

The Common Council approved Buttigieg's request to enable his administration to develop a city climate plan in April 2019; Buttigieg signed a contract with the Chicago firm Delta Institute to help develop it. In late November 2019, the city's Common Council voted 7–0 to approve the resultant Carbon Neutral 2050 plan, setting the goal of meeting the Paris Agreement's 26 percent emission reduction by 2025, and aiming for a further reductions of 45 percent by 2035.

Supporting private development in South Bend was another initiative Buttigieg continued during his second term. By 2019, the city had seen $374million in private investment for mixed-use developments since Buttigieg had taken office, by one estimate. By another account, Downtown South Bend saw roughly $200million in private investment during Buttigieg's tenure.

With respect to infrastructure, Buttigieg promoted the idea of moving the city's South Shore Line station from South Bend International Airport to the city's downtown in August 2018. He made it a goal to have the city complete this project by 2025. Also, South Bend launched Commuters Trust, a new transportation benefit program created in collaboration with local employers and transportation providers, including South Bend Transpo and Lyft, in 2019. The program was made possible by a $1million three-year grant from Bloomberg Philanthropies Mayors Challenge. Furthermore, under Buttigieg, South Bend invested $50million in the city's parks, many of which had been neglected during the preceding decades.

After a white South Bend police officer shot and killed Eric Logan, an African-American man, in June 2019, Buttigieg was drawn from his presidential campaign to focus on the emerging public reaction. Police body cameras were not turned on during Logan's death. Soon after Logan's death, Buttigieg presided over a town hall meeting attended by disaffected activists from the African-American community as well as relatives of the deceased man. The local police union accused Buttigieg of making decisions for political gain. Buttigieg secured $180,000 in November 2019 to commission a review of South Bend's police department policies and practices, to be conducted by Chicago-based consulting firm 21CP Solutions.

Many African-Americans have accused Buttigieg of racism for his response to this and other incidents. Former South Bend councilman Henry Davis Jr. alleged that Buttigieg "perpetuated and tolerated" systemic racism in the city. Michael Harriot, senior writer at The Root, accused Buttigieg of "racist paternalism" for saying that children of color lack role models that promote the value of education. Many African-Americans also point to Buttigieg's firing of Darryl Boykins, South Bend's first black chief of police. Boykins claimed that Buttigieg used a scandal—involving secret tapes of white police officers making racist comments—as a pretext for firing him.

Increased national profile 
In the 2016 U.S. Senate election in Indiana, he campaigned on behalf of Democratic Senate nominee Evan Bayh and criticized Bayh's opponent, Todd Young, for having voiced support in 2010 for retaining the military's don't ask, don't tell policy, which Bayh had voted to repeal. In the 2016 Democratic presidential primaries, Buttigieg endorsed Hillary Clinton. He also endorsed Democratic nominee Lynn Coleman in that year's election for Indiana's 2nd congressional district, which included South Bend.

Frank Bruni of The New York Times published a 2016 column praising Buttigieg's work as mayor, with a headline asking if he might be "the first gay president". Barack Obama cited him as one of the Democratic Party's talents in a November 2016 profile on the outgoing president conducted by The New Yorker. As Buttigieg's national profile grew following his run in the 2017 Democratic National Committee chairmanship election, Buttigieg increased his out-of-city travel. By early 2018, there was speculation that Buttigieg would run for either governor or president in 2020.

For the 2018 midterms, Buttigieg founded the political action committee (PAC) Hitting Home PAC. That October, Buttigieg personally endorsed 21 congressional candidates. He also later endorsed Mel Hall, Democratic nominee in the 2018 election for Indiana's 2nd congressional district. Buttigieg campaigned for Joe Donnelly's reelection campaign in the United States Senate election in Indiana. Buttigieg campaigned for candidates in more than a dozen states, including early presidential primary states such as Iowa and South Carolina, a move indicating potential interest in running for president. He officially announced his run on January 23, 2019.

Succession as mayor 
Buttigieg announced that he would not seek a third term as mayor of South Bend in December 2018. Buttigieg endorsed James Mueller in the 2019 South Bend mayoral election. Mueller was a high-school classmate of Buttigieg's and his mayoral chief of staff, and later executive director of the South Bend Department of Community Investment. Mueller's campaign promised to continue the progress that had been made under Buttigieg's mayoralty. Buttigieg appeared in campaign advertisements for Mueller and donated to Mueller's campaign. Mueller won the May 2019 Democratic primary with 37 percent of the vote in a crowded field. In the November 2019 general election, Mueller defeated Republican nominee Sean M. Haas with 63 percent of the vote. Mueller took office on New Year's Day 2020.

DNC chairmanship campaign 

In January 2017, Buttigieg announced his candidacy for chairman of the Democratic National Committee (DNC) in its 2017 chairmanship election. He built a national profile as an emerging dark horse in the race for the chairmanship with the backing of former DNC chairman Howard Dean, former Maryland governor Martin O'Malley, Indiana senator Joe Donnelly, and North Dakota senator Heidi Heitkamp. Buttigieg campaigned on the need for the Democratic Party to empower its millennial members.

Former U.S. Secretary of Labor Tom Perez and U.S. representative Keith Ellison quickly emerged as the favored candidates of a majority of DNC members. Buttigieg withdrew from the race on the day of the election without endorsing a candidate, and Perez was elected chairman after two rounds of voting.

2020 presidential campaign 

On January 23, 2019, Buttigieg announced that he was forming an exploratory committee to run for President of the United States in the upcoming 2020 election. Buttigieg sought the Democratic Party nomination for president. If he had been elected, he would have been the youngest and first openly gay American president. Amid the start of Buttigieg's presidential effort, on February 12, 2019, he published his debut book, autobiography Shortest Way Home. Two months later, Buttigieg officially launched his campaign on April 14, 2019, in South Bend.

Buttigieg described himself as a progressive and a supporter of democratic capitalism. Historian David Mislin identifies Buttigieg as a pragmatic progressive in the tradition of the Social Gospel movement once strong in the Midwest. Buttigieg identifies regulatory capture as a significant problem in American society.

Initially regarded as a long-shot candidate, Buttigieg rose into the top-tier of candidates in the primary by December 2019. In early February 2020, Buttigieg led the 2020 Iowa Democratic caucuses results with 26.2 percent to Bernie Sanders' 26.1 percent, winning 14 delegates to Sanders's 12. The LGBTQ Victory Fund, Buttigieg's first national endorsement, noted the historical first of an openly gay candidate winning a state presidential primary. Buttigieg finished second behind Sanders in the New Hampshire primary. After placing a fourth in the South Carolina primary with 8.2 percent of the vote, behind Joe Biden (48.7 percent), Bernie Sanders (19.8 percent), and Tom Steyer (11.3 percent), Buttigieg dropped out of the race on March 1, 2020, and endorsed Biden.

Post-presidential campaign
In April 2020, Buttigieg launched Win The Era PAC, a new super PAC to raise money and distribute it to down-ballot Democrats. The PAC focused on local elected positions, and its list of endorsements included candidates such as Jaime Harrison, Cal Cunningham, Gina Ortiz Jones, Christine Hunschofsky, and Levar Stoney. On June 8, 2020, the University of Notre Dame announced that it had hired Buttigieg as a teacher and researcher for the 2020–21 academic year. Also, in October 2020, Buttigieg released his second book, Trust: America's Best Chance.

Buttigieg acted as a surrogate for Biden's campaign in the general election. He delivered a speech on the closing night of the 2020 Democratic National Convention, and also announced Indiana's votes during the convention's roll call. On September 5, 2020, Buttigieg was announced to be a member of the advisory council of the Biden-Harris Transition Team, which was planning the presidential transition of Joe Biden. Ahead of the vice presidential debate, Buttigieg played the role as a stand-in for Republican vice president Mike Pence in Democratic to prepare vice presidential nominee Kamala Harris. Buttigieg was selected to perform this role because of his experience working with Pence during their simultaneous tenures as mayor of South Bend and governor of Indiana, respectively.

Secretary of Transportation

Following the end of his presidential campaign, Buttigieg was considered a possible Cabinet appointee in Joe Biden's administration. After Biden was declared the winner of the election on November 7, 2020, Buttigieg was again mentioned as a possible nominee for Secretary of Veterans Affairs, Ambassador to the United Nations, Ambassador to China or Secretary of Transportation. On December 15, 2020, Biden announced that he would nominate Buttigieg as his Secretary of Transportation. The Senate Commerce Committee advanced Buttigieg's nomination to the full Senate with a vote of 21–3. Buttigieg was confirmed on February 2, 2021, with a vote of 86–13; and was sworn in the next morning.

As Secretary of Transportation, Buttigieg has worked on re-organizing the department's internal policy structure, including carrying out a thorough review process of rules enacted under the Trump administration. For example, Buttigieg reinstated an Obama-era pilot program which ensures local hiring for public works projects on May 19, 2021, with the goal of helping minorities and disadvantaged individuals. This program had been revoked in 2017 during the Trump administration, when the Department of Transportation returned to rules established during the Reagan administration, which banned geographic-based hiring preferences.

Buttigieg addressed the African American Mayors Association in late February 2021 to discuss systemic racism. He argued that misguided investments in the federal transport and infrastructure policy had contributed to racial inequity. In early March 2021, Politico noted that Buttigieg had mentioned racial equity in almost every interview he gave to the press as it related to his work at the department. In late June 2022, Buttigieg launched a $1 billion Reconnecting Communities pilot program to establish racial equity in roads. Using money from the Infrastructure Investment and Jobs Act, the program aims to reconnect cities and neighborhoods divided by roads through projects such as rapid bus lines, pedestrian walkways, and planning studies.

Early into his tenure, Buttigieg noted that the United States's actions surrounding road traffic safety is lacking and suggested improving the design of roads. Also, while acknowledging how the United States fell behind other developed countries with respect to bicycle and pedestrian safety, Buttigieg encouraged greater focus on human behavior in infrastructure policy. Likewise, in March 2021, Buttigieg indicated he was open to tolls on Interstate 80, but not the tollage of bridges, suggesting "big picture solutions" instead, like a mileage tax. However, the Biden administration did not include a gas tax or mileage tax in the infrastructure plan it released that month.

Buttigieg informed Congress in late March 2021 that the Biden administration was planning to prioritize the construction of the Gateway Rail Tunnel Project due to its economic significance. The progress of the project, which was stalled by President Trump, was said to be moving faster, according to Senate Majority Leader Chuck Schumer. Buttigieg announced the environmental impact assessment of the project—which was largely seen as a sign of major progress on the project. Also, Buttigieg has served as a promoter of the American Jobs Plan and the Infrastructure Investment and Jobs Act.

In June 2021, the White House created a task force to address supply chain disruptions, with Buttigieg as one of its leaders. By October 2021, global supply bottlenecks had resulted in record shortages of household goods for American consumers. Buttigieg cited high demand and the pandemic as some of the causes for the disruptions, while predicting that the disruptions would "continue into next year".

After conservatives criticized Buttigieg for taking paternity leave, Buttigieg declared that he would not apologize for "taking care of my premature newborn infant twins. The work that we are doing is joyful, fulfilling, wonderful work." According to his department, Buttigieg had been on paid leave since mid-August 2021, where for a month he was "mostly offline except for major agency decisions and matters that could not be delegated", and he "has been ramping up activities since then", making many media appearances in early October 2021. The White House had approved Buttigieg's leave.

After passage of the Infrastructure Investment and Jobs Act, Insider called Buttigieg "the most powerful transportation secretary ever", as the department now has $210 billion of discretionary grants to award.

2023 Ohio train derailment 

On February 3, 2023, a freight train carrying vinyl chloride, butyl acrylate, ethylhexyl acrylate and ethylene glycol monobutyl ether derailed along the Norfolk Southern Railway in East Palestine, Ohio. Emergency crews conducted a controlled burn of the spill at the request of state officials, which released hydrogen chloride and phosgene into the air. As a result, residents within a 1 mi (1.6 km) radius were evacuated. Buttigieg tweeted on February 13 the Department would "use all relevant authorities to ensure accountability and continue to support safety."

In the weeks following the derailment, the Transportation Department, under Buttigieg, did not move to reinstate the 2015 rail safety rule aimed at expanding the use of better braking technology. Buttigieg's Transportation Department was contemplating stripping down brake safety rules even further.

Buttigieg has faced criticism across the political spectrum for his response to the derailment, from Democrats Nina Turner and Ilhan Omar and Republicans J. D. Vance and Anna Paulina Luna. Republican senator Marco Rubio called for Buttigieg to resign, and criticized him for not having yet visiting the disaster site at the time. Former president Donald Trump also criticized Buttigieg for not having yet visited the site while conducting a visit of his own.

In March 2023, Buttigieg appeared on CNN, telling the cable news network that he had failed to anticipated the fallout from the 3 February Norfolk Southern train derailment and erred in not visiting East Palestine sooner.

Political positions

Infrastructure 
During his 2020 campaign for the Democratic nomination, Buttigieg proposed spending $1trillion on U.S. infrastructure projects over the next ten years, estimating that the plan would create at least six million jobs. The plan focused on green energy, protecting tap water from lead, fixing roads and bridges, improving public transportation, repairing schools, guaranteeing broadband internet access, and preparing communities for floods and other natural disasters.

Social issues 
Buttigieg supports abortion rights and the repeal of the Hyde Amendment, which blocks federal funding for abortion services except in cases of rape, incest, or the life of the mother is in danger. He favors amending civil rights legislation, including the Federal Equality Act so that LGBT Americans receive federal non-discrimination protections.

Buttigieg supports expanding opportunities for national service, including a voluntary year of national service for those turning 18 years old.

In July 2019, Buttigieg shared his "Douglass Plan", named after abolitionist Frederick Douglass, to address systemic racism in America. The initiative would allocate $10billion to African-American entrepreneurship over five years, grant $25billion to historically black colleges, legalize marijuana, expunge drug convictions, halve the federal prison population, and propose a federal New Voting Rights Act designed to increase voting access.

Buttigieg supports abolishing the death penalty, moving toward reversing criminal sentences for minor drug-related offenses, and eliminating incarceration for drug possession offenses.

In 2019, Buttigieg called for the United States to decriminalize mental illness and addiction via initiatives such as re-entry programs. Also, he aspired to decrease incarceration rates because of mental illnesses or substance use by 75 percent during his first term as President of the United States.

Voting rights
Buttigieg favors the abolition of the Electoral College and has also called for restoring voting rights to felons who have completed their prison sentences.

Campaign finance reform 
Buttigieg supports a constitutional amendment on campaign finance to reduce the undue influence of money in politics. During his 2020 presidential run, in response to accusation of campaign finance concerns, Buttigieg's campaign told Newsweek that he did not accept contributions from individuals and organizations such as corporate political action committees. In addition, Buttigieg's campaign emphasized that Buttigieg had included critical campaign finance reforms as part of his campaign platform, including pushing to overturn Citizens United and Buckley v. Valeo.

Statehood advocacy 
Buttigieg supports statehood for the District of Columbia, and said that he would support Puerto Rico statehood if desired by the Puerto Rican people.

Climate change 

During his campaign for the Democratic presidential nomination, Buttigieg stated that, if elected, he would restore the United States' commitment to the Paris Climate Agreement and double its pledge to the Green Climate Fund. He also supports the Green New Deal proposed by House Democrats, solar panel subsidies, and a carbon tax and dividend policy to reduce greenhouse gas emissions.

Economic beliefs 

Buttigieg identifies as a democratic capitalist and has decried crony capitalism. He has entertained the possibility of antitrust actions against large technology companies on the basis of privacy and data security concerns. During the Democratic primary, he supported deficit and debt reduction, arguing that large debt makes it harder to invest in infrastructure, health and safety.

Workers' rights 
In July 2019, he released a plan to strengthen union bargaining power, to raise the minimum wage to $15, and to offer national paid family leave.

Education

Buttigieg's education plan includes a $700billion investment in universal full-day child care and pre-kindergarten for all children from infancy to age five. Buttigieg has also proposed tripling Title I funding for schools serving students predominately from lower socioeconomic backgrounds. Other goals include doubling the amount of new teachers of color in the next 10 years, addressing school segregation with a $500million fund, paying teachers more, expanding mental health services in schools, and creating more after-school programs and summer learning opportunities.

His plan for debt-free college has called for expanding Pell Grants for low-income students, as well as other investments and reversing Trump's tax cuts for the wealthy. Under Buttigieg's college plan, the bottom 80 percent of students with respect to income would have received free education, while the top 20 percent would have paid for at least some portion of their tuition. Buttigieg has opposed free college tuition for all students because he has believed universally free tuition unfairly subsidizes higher-income families at the expense of lower-income individuals who do not attend college. This position distinguished Buttigieg from his competitors in the 2020 presidential election.

Foreign policy 

Buttigieg called for modifying the structure of defense spending, while suggesting that he might favor an overall increase in defense spending.

Buttigieg has said that he believes the 2001 U.S. invasion of Afghanistan following the September 11 attacks was justified but supported the planned withdrawal of American troops from the region with a maintained intelligence presence. He is a committed supporter of Israel, favors a two-state solution to the Israeli–Palestinian conflict, opposes proposals for Israel to annex the Israeli-occupied West Bank, and disapproves of Israeli prime minister Benjamin Netanyahu's comments in support of applying Israeli law in Jewish settlements in the West Bank.

In 2008, Buttigieg wrote an op-ed in The New York Times calling on the United States to support the de facto independent Republic of Somaliland.

In June 2019, Buttigieg said: "We will remain open to working with a regime like the Kingdom of Saudi Arabia for the benefit of the American people. But we can no longer sell out our deepest values for the sake of fossil fuel access and lucrative business deals." He supports ending U.S. support for Saudi Arabia in Saudi Arabia's war in Yemen.

Buttigieg has condemned China for its mass detention of ethnic Uyghurs in Xinjiang. He criticized Trump's decision to withdraw U.S. troops from Syria, which critics say gave Turkey the green light to launch its military offensive against Syrian Kurds.

Health care 
Buttigieg opposed Republican efforts to repeal the Patient Protection and Affordable Care Act.

In 2018, Buttigieg said he favored Medicare for All. During his presidential campaign, Buttigieg has promoted Medicare for All Who Want It, which includes a public option for health insurance. He has spoken favorably of Maryland's all-payer rate setting. Buttigieg has described Medicare for All Who Want It as inclusive, more efficient than the current system, and a possible precursor or "glide path" to single-payer health insurance. He also favors a partial expansion of Medicare that would allow Americans ages 50 to 64 to buy into Medicare, and supports proposed legislation, the Family and Medical Insurance Leave Act, that would "create a fund to guarantee up to 12 weeks of partial income for workers to care for newborn children or family members with serious illnesses."

In August 2019, Buttigieg released a $300billion plan to expand mental health care services and fight addiction.

Immigration 
Buttigieg supports Deferred Action for Childhood Arrivals (DACA) and has drawn attention to the Trump administration's aggressive deportation policies. He defended a resident of Granger, Indiana, who was deported after living in the U.S. for 17 years despite regularly checking in with ICE and applying for a green card.

Buttigieg has said Trump has been reckless in sending American troops to the southern border, and that it is a measure of last resort.

Personal life 

Buttigieg is a Christian, and he has said his faith has had a strong influence in his life. He was baptized in the Catholic Church as an infant and he attended Catholic schools. While at the University of Oxford, Buttigieg began to attend Christ Church Cathedral and said he felt "more-or-less Anglican" by the time he returned to South Bend. St.Augustine, James Martin, and Garry Wills are among his religious influences. A member of the Episcopal Church, Buttigieg is a congregant at the Cathedral of St.James in downtown South Bend.

Besides his native English, Buttigieg has some knowledge of Norwegian, Spanish, Italian, Maltese, Arabic, Dari Persian, and French. Buttigieg plays guitar and piano, and in 2013 performed with the South Bend Symphony Orchestra as a guest piano soloist with Ben Folds. Buttigieg was a 2014 Aspen Institute Rodel Fellow.

Buttigieg came out as gay in a June 2015 piece in the South Bend Tribune, becoming Indiana's first openly gay elected executive. He was the first elected official in Indiana to come out while in office and the highest elected official in Indiana to come out.

Buttigieg announced his engagement to Chasten Glezman, a junior high school teacher, in a December 14, 2017 Facebook post. They had been dating since August 2015 after meeting on the dating app Hinge. They were married on June 16, 2018, in a private ceremony at the Cathedral of St.James. This made Buttigieg the first mayor of South Bend to get married while in office. Chasten uses his husband's surname, Buttigieg.

Buttigieg announced that he and his husband had become parents on August 17, 2021. Buttigieg announced that they had adopted two newborn fraternal twins on September 4, 2021.

In July 2022, Buttigieg established his permanent residence in Traverse City, Michigan, which is Chasten's hometown, and registered to vote in Michigan.

Awards and honors
Buttigieg was a 2015 recipient of the Fenn Award, given by the John F. Kennedy Presidential Library in recognition of his work as mayor. To mark the 50th anniversary of the Stonewall riots in June 2019, Queerty named him one of its "Pride50" people—"trailblazing individuals who actively ensure society remains moving towards equality, acceptance and dignity for all queer people". At the Golden Heart Awards, run by God's Love We Deliver, Buttigieg was awarded the "Golden Heart Award for Outstanding Leadership and Public Service" in October 2019. Equality California, an LGBT-rights organization, gave Buttigieg and his husband Chasten their Equality Trailblazer Award in August 2020. Attitude, a British gay lifestyle magazine, named Buttigieg their 2020 Person of the Year to recognize his groundbreaking run for the presidency.

Books

Electoral history

See also
List of Rhodes Scholars

Notes

References

External links 

 Biography at the United States Department of Transportation
 
 
 

1982 births
21st-century American Episcopalians
21st-century American male writers
21st-century American naval officers
21st-century American politicians
Alumni of Pembroke College, Oxford
American intelligence analysts
American LGBT military personnel
American Rhodes Scholars
21st-century American memoirists
American people of Maltese descent
Biden administration cabinet members
Candidates in the 2010 United States elections
Candidates in the 2020 United States presidential election
Converts to Anglicanism from Roman Catholicism
Gay military personnel
Gay politicians
American gay writers
Harvard College alumni
Indiana Democrats
LGBT Anglicans
LGBT appointed officials in the United States
LGBT mayors of places in the United States
Gay memoirists
LGBT people from Indiana
Living people
Mayors of South Bend, Indiana
McKinsey & Company people
Michigan Democrats
Military personnel from Indiana
People from Traverse City, Michigan
United States Navy personnel of the War in Afghanistan (2001–2021)
United States Navy reservists
United States Secretaries of Transportation
University of Notre Dame faculty
Writers from South Bend, Indiana
Biden administration personnel